José María Estrada Reyes (1802 in Granada – 13 August 1856 in Ocotal) was the President of Nicaragua under Fruto Chamorro’s command to direct the war, from 12 March to 23 October 1855.

Estrada was ratify as the provisional president, on 10 April 1855, a month later after Fruto Chamorro's death. In disgust of the efforts of peace promoted by José Trinidad Muñoz, and mediation offered by the president of El Salvador, the war continued because, with a conclusion, by the North American phalange of William Walker. When Walker took over Granada on October 13, who also appointed Patricio Rivas as the new President of Nicaragua, Estrada abandoned the Nicaraguan presidency on October 23, 1855. Estrada returned to Nicaragua, who decided to reorganize his government in Somotillo on 21 June 1856, and appointed Tomás Martínez as the Commander in Chief of the military. At the end, José María Estrada appointed Nicasio del Castillo as the new President of Nicaragua, whose government dissolved a month later.

References

1802 births
1856 deaths
People from Granada, Nicaragua
Nicaraguan people of Asturian descent
Conservative Party (Nicaragua) politicians
Presidents of Nicaragua